Pospěch is a Czech surname. Notable people with the surname include:

Zbyněk Pospěch (born 1982), Czech footballer
Zdeněk Pospěch (born 1978), Czech footballer

Czech-language surnames
Slavic-language surnames